The Drøbak Sound (Norwegian: Drøbaksundet) is a sound at the Oslofjord narrows between Drøbak and Hurum. Outer Oslofjord, which is a term for the Oslofjord south of the Drøbak Sound until it meets the Skagerrak.  Inner Oslofjord which is a term for the rest of the fjord, that starts in the Drøbak Sound northwards towards Oslo, where the fjord makes a turn and continues to the Bunne Fjord.

The Drøbak Sound was previously guarded by Oscarsborg Fortress. During the German invasion of Norway on 9 April 1940, the German cruiser  was sunk by the fortress. Oscarsborg Fortress has been converted into a museum and a hotel. There is a ferry from Drøbak.

The subsea Oslofjord Tunnel at the Norwegian National Road 23 is running underneath the Oslofjord connects the east side and the west side of the fjord.

See also 
 Battle of Drøbak Sound

References

Sounds of Norway
Frogn
Hurum